Ammannur Madhava Chakyar (13 May 1917 – 1 July 2008) was a master of Kutiyattam, the classical Sanskrit theatrical form indigenous to Kerala. He is best known for taking the performances from the temple sanctuaries where they were formerly confined and making them public events.

Recognition
  Padma Bhushan from Government of India–2003
Padmasri In 1981
  Sangeet Natak Akademi Award - 1979
 Kerala Sangeetha Nataka Akademi Fellowship - 1990
 Kalidasa Samman
D-Lit degree from University of Kannur, Kerala
Golden Bangle From International centre of Kutiyattam, Thrippunithura
Unesco Recitation from Paris in 2001
Kerala Sangeeth Natak Akademy Award
Kerala Kalamandalam Award

References

Further reading
  Into the world of Kutiyattam : with the legendary Ammannur Madhava Chakyar by  G. Venu (1945- ); foreword by Premlata Puri. Natana Kairali, 2002.

External links

 

1917 births
2008 deaths
Recipients of the Padma Bhushan in arts
Male actors from Thrissur
Recipients of the Sangeet Natak Akademi Award
Malayali people
Indian performance artists
20th-century Indian male actors
Indian male stage actors
Recipients of the Sangeet Natak Akademi Fellowship
Recipients of the Kerala Sangeetha Nataka Akademi Fellowship